The Belarusian minority in Poland is composed of 47,000 people according to the Polish census of 2011.  This number decreased in the last decades from over 300,000 due to an active process of assimilation. Most of them live in the Podlaskie Voivodeship.

A small but unconfirmed Belarusian population remains in the West Pomeranian Voivodeship in western Poland. They may be assimilated into the Polish population, but Belarusian culture has not firmly disappeared in the whole of Poland since World War II.

History

Polish–Lithuanian Commonwealth
Poland first acquired a Ruthenian (predominant ancestors of modern Belarusians) minority in the 16th century, when after the Union of Lublin in 1569 Poland gained control over some of eastern territories formerly belonging to the Grand Duchy of Lithuania. Poland retained control over that region until the partitions of Poland in the late 18th century. In time, the Belarusian culture and nationality started to develop in that region, but also increasing number of people became Polonized. Later influences, particularly Lithuanization and Russification, further contributed to the blurry ethnic border and resulted in a region with many territories with significant minority of one culture or another.

1918–1939

In 1921, at the end of the Polish–Soviet War, Belarusian territories were divided between Second Polish Republic and Soviet Russia under the terms of the Peace of Riga. Thus the newly reborn Poland gained a disputed territory, known as Kresy or West Belarus, inhabited by both Belarusians and Poles. According to the Polish census of 1921, there were around 1 million Belarusians in the country. According to Soviet sources, there were 3 million Belarusians in 1921. Most historians estimate the number of Belarusians in Poland at that time to be from 1.7 million up to 2 million. Belarusians formed 3.1% of the populations of the Second Polish Republic, mostly inhabiting the east-central voivodeships, particularly the Nowogródek Voivodeship. Belarusians consisted the majority of population of Polesie Voivodship, however most of them didn't declare themselves as Belarusians, but at Tutejsi ("Locals").

Several thousand Poles were settled in the area pursuant to the legislation of December 20, 1920. In the elections of November 1922, a Belarusian party (in the Blok Mniejszości Narodowych coalition) obtained 14 seats in the Polish parliament (11 of them in the lower chamber, Sejm). In the spring of 1923, Prime Minister of Poland Władysław Sikorski ordered a report on the situation of the Belarusian minority in Poland. That summer, a new regulation was passed allowing for the Belarusian language to be used officially both in courts and in schools. Obligatory teaching of Belarusian was introduced in all Polish gymnasia in areas inhabited by Belarusians in 1927.

In the 1921–1926 period Poland did not have a consistent policy towards its ethnic minorities. Belarusian schools, not being subsidized by the Polish government, were facing severe financial problems already by 1921. After an early period of liberalization, tensions between increasingly nationalistic Polish government and various increasingly separatist ethnic minorities started to grow, and the Belarusian minority was no exception. A Belarusian organization, the Belarusian Peasants' and Workers' Union, was banned in 1927, and opposition to Polish government was met with state repressions. Nonetheless compared to the (larger) Ukrainian minority, Belarusians were much less politically aware and active, and thus suffered fewer repressions than the Ukrainians.

Increasingly, Belarusians in Poland faced extensive Polonization. After the 1930 elections in Poland, Belarusian representation in the Polish parliament was reduced and in the early 1930s the Polish government started to introduce policies intended to Polonize minorities.

In 1935, after the death of Józef Piłsudski, a new wave of repressions was released upon the minorities, with many Orthodox churches and Belarusian schools being closed. In 1938 about 100 Orthodox churches were destroyed or converted to Roman Catholic ones in the eastern parts of Poland, the majority of them in ethnically Ukrainian territories. Use of Belarusian was discouraged.  Not a single Belarusian school survived until the spring of 1939, and only 44 schools teaching Belarusian still existed in Poland at the beginning of World War II.

Belarusian leadership was sent to Bereza Kartuska concentration camp. Earlier, Belarusian political leaders reported to the League of Nations of tens of thousands being flogged by police, and subject to torture in interrogations. According to Belarusian accounts, sixty to seventy peasants were hanged daily during anti-guerrilla campaigns.

After the August 1939 Nazi-Soviet Pact and pursuant German and Soviet invasion of Poland in September 1939, portrayed by Soviet propaganda as 'liberation of Western Belarus and Western Ukraine', many Belarusians welcomed unification with Belorussian SSR. Since 1939, with the exception of a brief period of Nazi occupation, almost all Belarusians previously living in Poland would live in the Belorussian SSR.

It was initially planned to move the capital of the Byelorussian SSR to Vilnius. However, the same year Joseph Stalin ordered that the city and surrounding region be transferred to Lithuania, which some months later was also invaded by Soviet Union and became a new Soviet Republic – Lithuanian SSR. Minsk therefore was proclaimed the capital of the enlarged Byelorussian SSR. The borders of the BSSR were again altered after the war (notably the largely Polish area around the city of Białystok was returned to Poland) but in general they coincide with the borders of the modern Republic of Belarus.

1989–present

The Belarusian minority has been active in political life in Poland since 1989.
In the 2006 elections to the Podlasie Sejmik, the Białoruski Komitet Wyborczy (Belarusian Electoral Committee) received 7,914 votes (2.05%), however this was not enough to receive any seats in the Council. The most votes from this list were for Jan Czykwin (2,405), Eugeniusz Wappa (1,669) and Eugeniusz Mironowicz (1,119).

When the local elections were repeated in the region on 20 May 2007, the Belarusians again submitted their own electoral committee, which for the first time had several Lithuanians running on the list, in their region of Sejny and Puńsk.

There is an unknown number of Belarusians in northwest Poland, but some Polish Belarusians were relocated there by the Soviet invasion of Germany in April 1945 and the captured lands of formerly German Pomerania was annexed by Poland.

See also 

Population exchange between Poland and Soviet Belarus in the aftermath of World War II
Belarus–Poland relations
Bilingual communes in Poland
Kresy
West Belarus
Stanisław Bułak-Bałachowicz
Polish minority in Belarus

Notes

References
 Łukasz Kaźmierczak, Trzy procent odmienności (Three percent of different) - article describing results of Polish census 2002 and minorities in Poland, citing census data
 Janusz Żarnowski, "Społeczeństwo Drugiej Rzeczypospolitej 1918-1939" (in Polish), Warszawa 1973
 Eugeniusz Mironowicz, "Białoruś" (in Polish), Trio, Warszawa, 1999,

External links
 Bialorus.pl - portal of Belarusian minority in Poland

Belarusians in Poland
Ethnic groups in Poland
Belarus–Poland relations